Bruce Gowers (21 December 1940 – 15 January 2023) was a British television director and producer, best known for his work on large-scale live music and event productions.

Life and career
Gowers was born in West Kilbride, Ayrshire, Scotland on 21 December 1940. He started his career in his native United Kingdom, where his music video for Queen's "Bohemian Rhapsody" brought him international recognition, leading to his relocation to the United States in the late 1970s.

His career included credits for the live episodes of  American Idol (2001–2010) which he directed from its inception, and awards shows including the Emmys, the MTV Video Music Awards, the Billboard Awards, and the American Music Awards, event specials including Live Earth, Live 8, and President Bill Clinton's Inaugural Concert at the Lincoln Memorial. He also directed musical specials for Michael Jackson and the Jacksons, the Rolling Stones, Ray Charles, Paul McCartney, Rod Stewart, and Britney Spears.

Gowers died of an acute respiratory infection in Santa Monica, California, on 15 January 2023, at the age of 82.

Television series
Music

American Idol (FOX) 2002–2007, 2009–2010
2009 Emmy Award Winner – Best Musical Variety Director.  5 Emmy Award nominations, DGA Award nominee
Celebrity Duets (FOX) 2006
Your Mama Don't Dance (Lifetime) 2008
So You Think You Can Dance (Fox) 2005
Pepsi Smash (WB) 2004
Big Break (Syndication) 1990
Dancin' to the Hits (Syndication) 30 episodes 1986–1987
Dick Clark Live (CBS) 1988–1989
Solid Gold (Paramount) 1985
Rock of the 80s (Showtime) – 1984 Ace Award Nominee
Britt Ekland's Jukebox (Syndication) 1979

Comedy

Whose Line Is It, Anyway? (ABC) 1998–2007
Penn & Teller's Sin City Spectacular (F/X) 1998

Kids

American Juniors (FOX) 2003
All That (Nickelodeon) 1999
The Amanda Show (Nickelodeon) 1999
Roundhouse (Nickelodeon) 1993–1994
The Kidsongs Television Show (called "The Kidsongs TV Show" in only season 1 (1987–1988)) (Public Television), 1987–1988, 1994–1995, 1997–1998

Misc.
The Spectacular World of Guinness Records (Syndication) 52 episodes, 1987–1989
This Is Your Life (NBC) 1983
We Interrupt This Week (PBS)
Headliners with David Frost (NBC) 1978

Award shows
The 57th & 59th Annual Primetime Emmy Awards (ABC) 2005, 2007
People's Choice Awards (CBS) 2005-2009
The Billboard Awards (Fox) 1995 - 2006
Kids' Choice Awards (Nickelodeon & MTV Networks) 2005 - 2007, 1995, 1994
Teen Choice Awards (Fox) 2004-2009
Miss America (CMT) 2006, 2008
The World Music Awards (ABC) 2005, 2004
Tributo A Nuestros Heroes (Telemundo Network) 2004
Spike Video Game Awards (Spike TV) 2004
The American Music Awards (ABC) 2003, 2002, 2001
The Blockbuster Awards (UPN) 1996-2001
Academy of Country Music Awards (CBS) 2002, 2001
MTV Movie Awards 1992 - 2002
The 72nd Annual Academy Awards Pre-Show (ABC) 2002, 2000
Muhammad Ali 60th Birthday Celebration (CBS) 2002
My VH1 Awards (VH1) 2000
The MTV Video Music Awards (MTV & Syndication) 2000, 1995–1994, 1992-1988—Winner of the 1990 Monitor Award for Best Director, multiple Ace & Monitor Award nominations
The Essence Awards (CBS & Fox) 1997, 1996, 1995, 1994, 1993 & 1992—1995 NAACP Image Award for Best Special
The ESPY Awards (ESPN, ABC) 1997, 1996 & 1995
The American Comedy Awards (ABC) 2000, 1999, 1998 & 1995
The AFI Salutes... (ABC) 2000, 1999
MTV's Fashionably Loud (MTV) 1998, 1997, 1996 & 1995
VH1 Fashion Awards (VH1) 1998, 1997 & 1996
1998 Skate, Rattle and Roll Championships (Fox) 1998
VH1 Honors (VH1) 1995, 1994
MTV European Music Awards (MTV) 1996, 1995, 1994
All Star Pro Sports Awards (ABC) 1990
American Video Awards (ABC) 1983, 1985–1986

Television specials
Music
Michael Jackson: 30th Anniversary Celebration, The Solo Years (CBS) 2001
Dick Clark's New Year's Rockin' Eve (ABC) 2007, 2008
I Walk the Line: A Night for Johnny Cash (CBS) 2005
An All-Star Salute to Patti LaBelle: Live From Atlantis (UPN) 2005
Live 8 Philadelphia (MTV/VH1, ABC) 2005
Genius: A Night for Ray Charles (CBS) 2004 – Winner of the 2004 DGA Award for Best Musical Variety Director. Emmy Award Nominee, Best Director
Prince Musicology (PPV) 2004
Ultimate Manilow (CBS) 2002
All Star Tribute to Brian Wilson (TNT) 2001
NSYNC - Atlantis Concert 2001
Women Rock: Girls with Guitars (Lifetime) 2001, 2000
Experience Music Project (VH1) 2000 (2 nights)
Arista's 25th Anniversary (NBC) 2000
Sarah Brightman: La Luna Concert (PBS) 2000
Britney Spears in Hawaii (FOX) 2000
Britney Spears: There's No Place Like Home (FOX) 2000
A Home for the Holidays (CBS) 2001, 2000
Radio City Grand Re-Opening (FOX) 1999
Ricky Martin: One Night Only (CBS) 1999
American Express Concert in Central Park (UPN) 1999
L'Oreal Summer Music Mania (UPN) 1999
Fleetwood Mac: The Dance (MTV) 1997 B DGA & EMMY Nominee for Best Director
Rolling Stones: Bridges to Babylon (Pay Per View) 1997
Woodstock (Pay Per View) 1994
An American Reunion: The Lincoln Memorial Inaugural Concert (HBO) 1993
MTV'S Inaugural Gala Ball (MTV) 1993
Up-close: Paul McCartney (MTV & ABC) 1993
Rod Stewart Valentine Vagabond (Live Pay Per View Concert) 1992
Dwight Yokum (Live Pay Per View Concert) 1991
MTV Unplugged With Paul McCartney (MTV) 1991—Ace Award Nominee
Arista's 15th Anniversary "That's What Friends Are For" (CBS) 1990
Huey Lewis and the News (Showtime) 1985—Grammy Award winner for Best Director
Men at Work "Live in San Francisco" (HBO) 1984—Monitor Award winner
Soul Session: James Brown & Friends (Cinemax) – 1987 Ace Award for Best Director
Harry Belafonte: Don't Stop the Carnival (HBO) 1985
The Doobie Brothers Farewell Concert (Showtime) 1985
Rod Stewart, Tonight He's Yours (Syndication) 1981
Legends of Rock 'N Roll (Cinemax) 1989

Comedy

3 Cats From Miami (HBO) 1998
Rodney Dangerfield's 75th Birthday Toast (HBO) 1997
Paula Poundstone Goes to Harvard (HBO) 1995
TV's All Time Classic Comedy (Fox) 1994
Dame Edna's Hollywood I, II & III (NBC) (Three 1 Hour Specials) 1992, 1991
Paul Rodriguez Special (Fox) 1992
The 14th Annual Young Comedians Show (HBO) 1991 with Richard Lewis
Paula Poundstone:  Cats, Cops and Stuff (HBO) 1990 – Ace Award nominee 1991
Richard Lewis "I'm Doomed" (HBO) 1990 – Ace Award nominee 1990
Harry Anderson's Sideshow (NBC) 1987
This Is Your Life, 30th Anniversary Special (NBC) 1987
Richard Lewis:  "I'm Exhausted" (HBO) 1988
George Carlin's "What Am I Doing in New Jersey?" (HBO) 1988
The 11th Annual Young Comedian's Special (HBO) 1988
Robin Williams, an Evening at The Met (HBO) – 1988 Monitor Award nominee and 1987 Ace Award nominee, both for Best Director
Harry Anderson "Hello Sucker" (Showtime) 1986
Jerry Seinfeld Special (HBO) 1987
Greater Tuna (HBO) 1984—Monitor Award Winner for Best Cable Program, Ace Award Nominee for Best Director
Billy Crystal - A Comic's Line (HBO) 1984
Richard Belzer Caught in the Act (Cinemax) 1984
Eddie Murphy Delirious (HBO) 1983

Miscellaneous specials

Explosion! (ABC) 1997
City Kids All-star Celebration (ABC) 1995
World of Entertainment (Syndication) 1982
All-Star Salute to Mother's Day (NBC) 1981
The II, III, IV & V International Guinness Book of World Records (ABC)
David Frost with The Shah of Iran (ABC) 1980

Videos

Selected music videos directed by Bruce Gowers:

Filmography

Documentaries
Hello Dalí (1973)
Finnan Games (1975)

Television pilots
George Lopez Talk Show (WAD Productions) 2008
Glam Me Up (CW Network) 2008
Roundhouse (Nickelodeon) 1992
America's Funniest People (ABC) 1990
The Kidsongs TV Show (Syndication) 1988
Dancin' to The Hits (Syndication) 1986
Footlight Follies 1988
Double Takes 1987

Awards

Grammy Award winner:
Huey Lewis and the News (Showtime) 1985 – Best Director long form music video

Emmy Award winner :
American Idol (FOX) 2009 – Best Musical Variety Director
Hello Dalí (1973) – Documentary Director
The 4th International Guinness Book of World Records; (1982) – Editor

Emmy nominations:
American Idol (2006, 2007), Genius: A Night for Ray Charles (2004), Fleetwood Mac: The Dance (1997)

DGA Award winner:
Genius: A Night for Ray Charles (CBS) 2004 – Best Musical Variety Director

DGA Award nominations:
American Idol (2006), Fleetwood Mac: The Dance (1997)

Ace Award winner:
Soul Session: James Brown & Friends (Cinemax) – 1987 Best Director
Greater Tuna (HBO) 1984 Best Director

Monitor Award winner:
Men at Work "Live in San Francisco" (HBO) 1984 Best Director
The MTV Video Music Awards (MTV & Syndication) 1990 Best Director

Monitor Award nominations:
The MTV Video Music Awards, Robin Williams: An Evening at The Met (HBO) 1988, The Kidsongs TV Show (PBS) 1988

NAACP Image Award winner:
The Essence Awards 1995: Best Special

Golden Harp Award winner:
Finnan Games

See also
 Music videos directed by Bruce Gowers
 Kidsongs

References

External links

 

1940 births
2023 deaths
British music video directors
Grammy Award winners